The Second Battle of Collierville (November 3, 1863), also known as the Action at Collierville, was fought during the American Civil War between the United States (Union) and Confederate States. The fighting occurred during a demonstration on Collierville, Tennessee, by Brigadier-General James R. Chalmers, Confederate States Army.

Background
Four minor battles occurred in 1863 in Shelby County during a three-month period. The two largest battles occurred on October 11 and November 3, 1863. The battle on October 11 was the largest land battle fought in the county.

Battle
The battle on November 3 was intended to be a Confederate cavalry raid to break up the Memphis and Charleston Railroad behind Sherman's Fifteenth Army Corps, then in the process of marching to the relief of Chattanooga, Tennessee. But, when Confederate Brigadier-General James Chalmers, leading a cavalry division riding up from Mississippi, learned that only one Union regiment was left to defend Collierville, Tennessee, he decided to attack. He supposed Union Colonel Edward Hatch possessed fewer men stationed at Collierville and at Germantown,  to the west, than he actually did. Hatch's scouts warned him of Chalmers's approach from the south, so he ordered Collierville's defenders to be prepared and rode from Germantown with cavalry reinforcements.

Chalmers, as he had done only three weeks earlier, attacked from the south with McCulloch's and Slemon's brigades. The Union post was defended by eight companies of the 7th Illinois Cavalry and two howitzers. Hatch quickly arrived with the 6th Illinois and 2nd Iowa cavalry. The Confederates launched an attack with only part of Slemon's brigade, believing faulty intelligence that it was lightly defended. The Union's 2nd Iowa Cavalry opened fire with their Colt's New Model Revolving rifles and repulsed the attack.  Surprised by the unexpected appearance of the enemy on his flanks, Chalmers concluded that he was outnumbered, called off the battle, and, to ward off Union pursuit, withdrew back to Mississippi. He reported 6 dead and 89 wounded or missing, including Colonel James Z. George, commanding the 5th Mississippi Cavalry. Hatch reported the loss of approximately 60 casualties. The Memphis and Charleston Railroad remained open to Tuscumbia, Alabama, for Union troop movements.

Notes

Further reading
Rowland, Dunbar & Howell, H. Grady, Jr., "Military History of Mississippi, 1803-1898", Chickasaw Bayou Press, 2003, Library of Congress Number 2002117732

1863 in Tennessee
Collierville II
Collierville II
Collierville, Tennessee
Collierville II
History of Shelby County, Tennessee
November 1863 events
Collierville II